

The  is a single elimination professional wrestling tournament held by CyberFight in their Ganbare☆Pro-Wrestling (GanPro) brand.

The first two editions in 2017 and 2018 had no stakes other than bragging rights. In 2021, the tournament made a comeback with LEC, Inc. as a sponsor. This edition crowned the inaugural Spirit of Ganbare World Openweight Champion.

Tournaments

Results

2017

The 2017 Ganbare☆Climax was held from August 11 to August 13. The first two rounds were held on individual nights, with round one taking up the entire card on August 11.

2018

The 2018 Ganbare☆Climax was held from August 11 to August 12, and featured only eight participants. Two of the first round matches were held under No DQ & No Ropes rules.

† This was a No DQ & No Ropes match.

2021

On September 25, 2021, GanPro announced that the Ganbare☆Climax was returning for a third edition sponsored by LEC Cleanpa! that would run from October 24 to November 23. The tournament featured fourteen participants (two of which would receive a bye to the second round) and was won by Tatsuhito Takaiwa who was then crowned the inaugural Spirit of Ganbare World Openweight Champion.

See also
CyberFight
DDT Pro-Wrestling
King of DDT Tournament

References

DDT Pro-Wrestling
Professional wrestling tournaments